

Kinsley is a village in the civil parish of Hemsworth, and the City of Wakefield district of West Yorkshire, England.

Kinsley is a rural, ex-mining village. Its neighbouring villages are Fitzwilliam to the north, to which it is conjoined, and Hemsworth to the south-east.
 
A railway station at Fitzwilliam gives access to Wakefield, Leeds, Doncaster and Sheffield.

History
The village is probably best known for the Kinsley evictions of 15 August 1905, when 25 families were evicted from their homes by police during a strike at Hemsworth Colliery.  They were made temporarily homeless, and eventually set up camp at Outwood Hall farm in Outwood, West Yorkshire.

Landmarks 

Kinsley Greyhound Stadium is at the centre of the village on Wakefield Road.

To the south of the greyhound stadium and Hoyle Mill Road, is Hemsworth Water Park & Playworld, which has two lakes: the larger lake is used for pedalo rides and has sandy beaches; the smaller lake is in a more secluded area which attracts wildlife. Both lakes are stocked for fishing. Grassed areas provide for picnics and games, contain an outdoor adventure playground for children, and a miniature railway.

At the south of the Water Park is Vale Head Park, with 9-hole golf course, tennis court, crazy golf and play park facilities.

Education 
Education in Kinsley is provided by Kinsley J&I School on the Wakefield Road. Hemsworth Arts and Community Academy in the neighbouring village of Hemsworth is the secondary school for 11- to 16- and 16- to 19-year-olds.

In December 2016, three cleaners at Kinsley J&I School were sacked after striking in protest at outsourcing.  The sacking was condemned by Labour Party leader Jeremy Corbyn.

See also
Kinsley Greyhound Stadium

References

External links

Villages in West Yorkshire
Hemsworth